Michael Sela (Mieczysław Salomonowicz; 2 March 1924 – 27 May 2022) was an Israeli immunologist of Polish Jewish origin. He was the W. Garfield Weston Professor of Immunology at the Weizmann Institute of Science in Rehovot. He was a president of the Weizmann Institute of Science.

Early life and academic career 
Michael Sela was born as Mieczysław Salomonowicz in Tomaszów Mazowiecki, Poland, on 2 March 1924. In 1935 when he was 11 years old he and his family moved to Romania. In 1941 when he was 17 years old he and his family immigrated to Mandatory Palestine. He studied at the Hebrew University of Jerusalem (M.Sc., Chemistry, 1946; Ph.D., 1954).

Sela was professor in the Weizmann Institute's Immunology Department. He was also a president of the Weizmann Institute of Science, from 1975 to 1985. He died in Rehovot on 27 May 2022 at the age of 98.

Research 
Sela is known for his research in immunology, particularly for research on synthetic antigens, molecules that trigger the immune system to attack. This work of Sela has led to the discovery of the genetic control of the immune response, as well as to the design of vaccines based on synthetic molecules.

He was among the first who introduced the use of linear and branched synthetic polypeptides as antigens, and this  brought about a better understanding of immunological phenomena.

For several decades, Sela was interested in the possibility of fighting the autoimmune disease, experimental allergic encephalomyelitis with synthetic analogs of the molecules in the myelin sheath of the brain which are capable of provoking the disease.

He is probably best known as the co-developer (with Ruth Arnon and Dvora Teitelbaum) of the multiple sclerosis drug copaxone.

Awards and honours 
Sela received numerous major national and international awards:
 The Israel Prize in Life Sciences (1959)
 Germany's Otto Warburg Medal (1968)
 The Rothschild Prize (1968)
Member of the American Academy of Arts and Sciences (1971)
 Germany's Emil von Behring Prize (1973)
Member of the National Academy of Sciences of the United States (1976)
 Canada's Gairdner Foundation International Award (1980)
 France's Institut de la Vie Prize (1984)
 Germany's Commander's Cross of the Order of Merit Award (1986)
 France's Officier de l'Ordre de la Légion d'honneur (1987)
 Member (Hon. causa) of The Romanian Academy (Academia Română), (1991).
 UNESCO's Albert Einstein Golden Medal (1995)
Member of the American Philosophical Society (1995)
 Interbrew-Baillet Latour Health Prize of Belgium (1997)
 The Wolf Prize in Medicine (1998), along with Ruth Arnon, for "their major discoveries in the field of immunology".

See also 
List of Israel Prize recipients

References

External links 
 The Wolf Prize in Medicine in 1998 (detail)
 The Interbrew-Baillet Latour Health Prize of Belgium in 1997

1924 births
2022 deaths
Hebrew University of Jerusalem alumni
Jews in Mandatory Palestine
Israeli Jews
Israeli people of Polish-Jewish descent
Polish emigrants to Mandatory Palestine
People from Tomaszów Mazowiecki
Israeli immunologists
Wolf Prize in Medicine laureates
Commanders Crosses of the Order of Merit of the Federal Republic of Germany
Members of the European Academy of Sciences and Arts
Academic staff of Weizmann Institute of Science
Israel Prize in life sciences recipients
Presidents of Weizmann Institute of Science
Members of the Israel Academy of Sciences and Humanities
Officiers of the Légion d'honneur
Foreign associates of the National Academy of Sciences
Foreign Members of the Russian Academy of Sciences
Presidents of universities in Israel
Members of the American Philosophical Society